Addo is a town in Sarah Baartman District Municipality in the Eastern Cape province of South Africa.

Region east of the Sundays River, some 72 km northeast of Port Elizabeth. The name is also borne by a railway station, post office and bridge. Of Khoekhoen origin, the name probably means 'euphorbia ravine'.

References

External links 

Populated places in the Sunday's River Valley Local Municipality